FK506-binding protein 4 is a protein that in humans is encoded by the FKBP4 gene.

Function 

The protein encoded by this gene is a member of the immunophilin protein family, which play a role in immunoregulation and basic cellular processes involving protein folding and trafficking. This encoded protein is a cis-trans prolyl isomerase that binds to the immunosuppressants FK506 and rapamycin. It has high structural and functional similarity to FK506-binding protein 1A (FKBP1A), but unlike FKBP1A, this protein does not have immunosuppressant activity when complexed with FK506. It interacts with interferon regulatory factor-4 and plays an important role in immunoregulatory gene expression in B and T lymphocytes. This encoded protein is known to associate with phytanoyl-CoA alpha-hydroxylase. It can also associate with two heat shock proteins (hsp90 and hsp70) and thus may play a role in the intracellular trafficking of hetero-oligomeric forms of the steroid hormone receptors. This protein correlates strongly with adeno-associated virus type 2 vectors (AAV) resulting in a significant increase in AAV-mediated transgene expression in human cell lines. Thus this encoded protein is thought to have important implications for the optimal use of AAV vectors in human gene therapy.

Structure 

This protein contains TPR repeats and has a PPlase domain.

Clinical significance 

Recent research suggests that FKBP4 may play a role in preventing the Tau protein from turning pathogenic. This may prove significant for the development of new Alzheimer's drugs and for detecting the disease before the onset of clinical symptoms.

Interactions 

FKBP4 has been shown to interact with GLMN.

See also 
 Glucocorticoid receptor
 Immunophilins
 FKBP5
 FKBP3 - A DNA binding FKBP.

References

Further reading

External links 
 

EC 5.2.1
Co-chaperones